The 1975 Italian local elections were held on 15 and 16 June. The elections were held in 6,345 municipalities and 86 provinces.

Municipal elections

Provincial elections

References

1975 elections in Italy
 
Municipal elections in Italy
June 1975 events in Europe